Ronald Ralph Williams (14 October 1906 – 3 February 1979) was a Church of England bishop. He was Principal of St John's College, Durham from 1945 to 1953 and Bishop of Leicester from 1953 to 1979.

Early life and education
Williams was born on 14 October 1906 to the Revd Ralph Williams and Mary ( Sayers). He attended The Judd School, a grammar school in Tonbridge, Kent. He went on to study English and theology at Gonville and Caius College, Cambridge and Ridley Hall, Cambridge. He obtained second class honours in Part I of the English Tripos in 1926, first class honours in Part I Theology Tripos, and a distinction in Part II of the Theology Tripos with which he graduated with Bachelor of Arts (BA) degree in 1928.

Ordained ministry
Williams was too young to be ordained immediately after leaving university in 1928, and so spent the following year as a tutor at St Aidan's College, Birkenhead. Having been ordained in the Church of England, he served his curacy at Leyton Parish Church from 1929 to 1931, and examining chaplain to the Bishop of Chelmsford in 1931. He then returned to Ridley Hall, Cambridge, the theological college where he trained for ministry, serving as its chaplain from 1931 to 1934. He was Home Education Secretary for the Church Missionary Society (CMS) from 1934 to 1940. With the outbreak of the Second World War, he joined the Religions Division of the Ministry of Information in 1940, and went on to serve as its director from 1943 to 1945.

In 1944, it was announced that he had been selected as the next Principal of St John's College, Durham in succession to C. S. Wallis. St John's College is both a residential college of the University of Durham and an evangelical Anglican theological college of the Church of England. He took up the appointment in 1945, and rebuilt the college physically and financially after the end of the War. He was also an honorary canon of Durham Cathedral from 1953 to 1954.

In October 1953, it was announced that Williams would be the next Bishop of Leicester. He was installed as diocesan bishop during a service at Leicester Cathedral in January 1954. He also served as President (ie its figurehead) of Queen's College, Birmingham from 1957 to 1963. He entered the House of Lords in 1959 as a lord spiritual. Although described as a liberal evangelical, he voted against an Anglican-Methodist reunion and was a staunch defender of the establishment of the Church of England. He abstained from voting on the Sexual Offences Act 1967: his twofold reasoning was that homosexuality should not be illegal but that it was still morally wrong, and so "the balance of my convictions can be expressed only by abstention". He retired in 1979, and was succeeded as Bishop of Leicester by Richard Rutt.

He wrote The Perfect Law of Liberty: An Interpretation of Psalm 119.

References 

 
 
 

1906 births
Alumni of Gonville and Caius College, Cambridge
Holders of a Lambeth degree
Bishops of Leicester
People educated at The Judd School
20th-century Church of England bishops
1979 deaths
Principals of St John's College, Durham
Evangelical Anglican bishops